This page lists brigades, regiments, battalions, and other formations and units of the Italian Army since World War II grouped by their administrative corps. Units grouped under their operational headquarters are listed at Structure of the Italian Army.

The units are listed by order of precedence. After the unit's name, the date of foundation i.e. *1624 and the location it is currently based follows. Disbanded units follow below the active units.

Infantry Corps

Granatieri

History 

The Granatieri (Grenadiers) are the oldest speciality of the Italian Army and act as honor guard for the President of Italy. In 1975 the Granatieri battalions, with the exception of the 3rd Battalion, were named for battles in which the Granatieri had distinguished themselves. The 3rd Battalion was named for the oldest regiment of their line.

Active units 
  Mechanized Brigade "Granatieri di Sardegna", *1976-
  Infantry Division "Granatieri di Sardegna", *1948-1976
  21st Infantry Division "Granatieri di Sardegna", *1934-1943
 "Granatieri di Sardegna" Brigade, *1831-1939
  1st Regiment "Granatieri di Sardegna", *1659-1943,1946-1976, 1992- (Rome)
  1st Mechanized Granatieri Battalion "Assietta", *1976-1992
  2nd Regiment "Granatieri di Sardegna", *1744-1943, 1992-2002, 2022-
  2nd Mechanized Granatieri Battalion "Cengio", *1976-1992, 2017-2022
  3rd Granatieri Command and Tactical Supports Unit "Guardie", *2022 (Rome)
  3rd Regiment "Granatieri Guardie", 1992-2002
  3rd Granatieri Battalion "Guardie", *1976-1992
  3rd Regiment "Granatieri di Sardegna", *1926-1943

Fanteria (Line Infantry)

History

Active units 
Italian Infantry units are named for regions and cities. However the 5th, 13th, 17th, 20th, 21st, 60th, 66th, 67th, 87th, 114th, 120th, and 151st infantry battalions are named for battles, while the 52nd is named for the Alps and the 1st carries the name of Saint Justus of Trieste.

  Division "Acqui", *1831 (San Giorgio a Cremano)
  Mechanized Brigade "Aosta", *1831 (Messina)
  Mechanized Brigade "Pinerolo", *1831 (Bari)
  Airmobile Brigade "Friuli", *1884-1926, 1960- (Gorizia)
  Mechanized Brigade "Sassari", *1915 (Sassari)
  Infantry School, *1849 (Cesano)
  5th Infantry Regiment "Aosta", *1690 (Messina)
  5th Infantry Battalion "Col della Berretta", *1975-1992
  6th Command and Tactical Supports Unit "Aosta", *2022 (Messina)
  6th Infantry Regiment "Aosta", *1690-1955
  9th Infantry Regiment "Bari", *1734 (Bari)
  13th Command and Tactical Supports Unit "Pinerolo", *2022 (Bari)
  13th Infantry Regiment "Pinerolo", *1672-1990
  13th Infantry Battalion "Valbella", *1975-1990
  17th Volunteer Training Regiment "Acqui", *1703 (Capua)
  17th Infantry Battalion "San Martino", *1975-1992
  28th Regiment "Pavia", *1860 (Pesaro)
  45th Command and Tactical Supports Unit "Reggio", *2022 (Sassari)
  45th Infantry Battalion "Arborea", *1977-1993
  45th Infantry Regiment "Reggio", *1859-2003
  57th Command and Tactical Supports Unit "Abruzzi", *1861 (Capua)
  57th Infantry Regiment "Abruzzi", *1861-2013
  62nd Infantry Regiment "Sicilia", *1861 (Catania)
  66th Airmobile Infantry Regiment "Trieste", *1862 (Forlì)
  66th Infantry Battalion "Valtellina", *1975-1993
  78th Command and Tactical Supports Unit "Lupi di Toscana", *2022 (Florence)
  78th Infantry Regiment "Lupi di Toscana", *1862-2008
  80th Volunteer Training Regiment "Roma", *1889 (Cassino)
  82nd Infantry Regiment "Torino", *1884 (Barletta)
  85th Volunteer Training Regiment "Verona", *1884 (Verona)
  87th Command and Tactical Supports Unit "Friuli", *2022 (Bologna)
  87th Infantry Regiment "Friuli", *1884-1991
  87th Infantry Battalion "Senio", *1975-1991
  151st Infantry Regiment "Sassari", *1915 (Cagliari)
  151st Infantry Battalion "Sette Comuni", *1976-1992
  152nd Infantry Regiment "Sassari", *1915 (Sassari)
  235th Volunteer Training Regiment "Piceno", *1917 (Ascoli Piceno)

Inactive units 
Inactivated units of the Infantry of the Line:

  Division "Friuli", *1884-2019
  Division "Mantova", *1942-2013
  Mechanized Division "Folgore", *1944-1986
  Motorized Brigade "Acqui", *1859-1926, 1975-1996
  Infantry Brigade "Avellino", *1949-1965
  Mechanized Brigade "Brescia", *1859–1939, 1975-1991
  Motorized Brigade "Cremona", *1859-1926, 1975-1996
  Mechanized Brigade "Gorizia", *1975-1996
  Mechanized Brigade "Legnano", *1975-1997
  Mechanized Brigade "Isonzo", *1975-1986
  Mechanized Brigade "Mantova", *1915-1919, 1986-1997
  Mechanized Brigade "Trieste", *1960-1991
  1st Infantry Regiment "San Giusto", *1624-2008
  4th Infantry Regiment "Piemonte", *1636-1943
  4th Infantry Battalion "Guastalla", *1977-1991
  7th Infantry Regiment "Cuneo", *1701-2001
  11th Infantry Regiment "Casale", *1619-1999
  16th Infantry Regiment "Savona", *1815-1991
  20th Infantry Regiment "Brescia", *1848-1991
  20th Infantry Battalion "Monte San Michele", *1975-1991
  21st Infantry Regiment "Cremona", *1848-2003
  21st Infantry Battalion "Alfonsine", *1975-1993
  22nd Infantry Regiment "Cremona", *1848-1990
  22nd Infantry Battalion "Primaro", *1975-1990
  23rd Infantry Regiment "Como", *1848-1996
  26th Infantry Regiment "Bergamo", *1859-1999
  30th Infantry Regiment "Pisa", *1859-1991
  33rd Infantry Regiment "Livorno", *1859-1943
  33rd Infantry Battalion "Ardenza", *1975-1991
  37th Infantry Regiment "Ravenna", *1859-1991
  40th Infantry Regiment "Bologna", *1859-1991
  41st Infantry Regiment "Modena", *1859-1995
  46th Infantry Regiment "Reggio", *1859-1978
  47th Infantry Regiment "Ferrara", *1859-2015
  47th Infantry Battalion "Salento", *1977-1997
  48th Infantry Regiment "Ferrara", *1859-1991
  52nd Infantry Regiment "Alpi", *1859-1943, 1958-1975
  53rd Infantry Regiment "Umbria", *1975-1996
  59th Infantry Regiment "Calabria", *1861-1991
  60th Infantry Regiment "Calabria", *1861-2005
  60th Infantry Battalion "Col di Lana", *1975-2005
  63rd Infantry Regiment "Cagliari", *1862-1991
  67th Infantry Regiment "Legnano", *1862-1995
  67th Infantry Battalion "Montelungo", *1975-1993
  68th Infantry Regiment "Legnano", *1862-1989
  68th Infantry Battalion "Palermo", *1975-1989
  72nd Infantry Battalion "Puglie", *1862-1999
  73rd Infantry Regiment "Lombardia", *1859-1986
  75th Infantry Regiment "Napoli", *1861-1958
  76th Infantry Regiment "Napoli", *1861-1997
  84th Infantry Regiment "Venezia", *1884-2000
  89th Infantry Regiment "Salerno", *1884-1991
  91st Infantry Battalion "Lucania", *1977-2009 
  92nd Infantry Regiment "Basilicata", *1884-1996
  114th Infantry Regiment "Mantova", *1915-1995
  114th Infantry Battalion "Moriago", *1975-??
  120th Infantry Regiment "Emilia", *1915-1991
  120th Infantry Battalion "Fornovo", *1975-1991
  121st Infantry Regiment "Macerata", *1915-2000
  123rd Infantry Battalion "Chieti", *1985-2012
  130th Infantry Regiment "Perugia", *1915-1996
  141st Infantry Regiment "Catanzaro", *1915-1995
  157th Infantry Regiment "Leoni di Liguria", *1915-2004
  225th Infantry Regiment "Arezzo", *1916-1999
  231st Infantry Regiment "Avellino", *1916-2004
  244th Infantry Regiment "Cosenza", *1917-1992

Bersaglieri

History 

Originally raised as sharpshooters and skirmishers, the Bersaglieri serve since World War II mostly as mechanized infantry. In 1975 the Bersaglieri battalions, with the exception of the 1st and 11th battalion, were named for battles in which the Bersaglieri had distinguished themselves. The 1st Bersaglieri Battalion is named for the founder of the Bersaglieri corps General Alessandro Ferrero La Marmora, while the 11th Battalion, which had received the war flag of the 182nd Regiment "Garibaldi", was named for the island of Caprera where Italy's national hero Giuseppe Garibaldi spent the last years of his life.

Active units 
  Bersaglieri Brigade "Garibaldi", *1975- (Caserta)
  1st Bersaglieri Regiment, *1861-1943, 1953-1976, 1995- (Cosenza)
  1st Bersaglieri Battalion "La Marmora", *1976-1995
  3rd Bersaglieri Regiment, *1861-1943, 1946-1975, 1991- (Teulada)
  18th Bersaglieri Battalion "Poggio Scanno", *1975-1991
  4th Bersaglieri Command and Tactical Supports Unit, *2022 (Caserta)
  4th Bersaglieri Regiment, *1861-1944
  26th Bersaglieri Battalion "Castelfidardo", *1975-1998
  6th Bersaglieri Regiment, *1861-1865, 1871-1943, 1992- (Trapani)
  6th Bersaglieri Battalion "Palestro", *1975-1989
  7th Bersaglieri Regiment, *1871-1943, 1992- (Altamura)
  10th Bersaglieri Battalion "Bezzecca, *1975-1992
  8th Bersaglieri Regiment, *1871-1943, 1949-1975, 1993- (Caserta)
  3rd Bersaglieri Battalion "Cernaia", *1975-1993
  11th Bersaglieri Regiment, *1883-1943, 1992- (Orcenico Superiore), in 1992 the 27th Bersaglieri Battalion "Jamiano" joined the regiment, which was replaced by the 11th Bersaglieri Battalion "Caprera" in 1997 
  11th Bersaglieri Battalion "Caprera", *1975-1997

 Inactive units 
Inactivated units of the Bersaglieri specialty:

  Mechanized Brigade "Goito", *1975-1991
  2nd Bersaglieri Regiment, *1861-1943, 1992-2001
  2nd Bersaglieri Battalion "Governolo", *1975-1992
  5th Bersaglieri Regiment, *1861-1943
  14th Bersaglieri Battalion "Sernaglia", *1977-1989
  9th Bersaglieri Regiment, *1871-1942
  28th Bersaglieri Battalion "Oslavia", *1975-1996
  12th Bersaglieri Regiment, *1883-1942, 1992-2005
  23rd Bersaglieri Battalion "Castel di Borgo", *1975-1992
  18th Bersaglieri Regiment, *1917-1919, 1935-1936, 1942-1943, 1993-2005
  67th Bersaglieri Battalion "Fagare", *1975-1993
  27th Bersaglieri Battalion "Jamiano", *1975-1992, joined the 11th Bersaglieri Regiment in 1992, was replaced by the 11th Bersaglieri Battalion "Caprera" in 1997 and then inactivated

 Alpini 
 History 

Alpini are the Italian Army's mountain infantry units. Since their founding in 1872 the battalions of the Alpini were named for the Alpine villages and cities were the battalions had their depot. First line reserve battalions were named after the valleys (Val) surrounding the locations of the depots, and  second line reserve battalions were named for mountains (Monte) located within the valleys surrounding the locations of the depots.

 Active units 
In 1975 all regiments were disbanded and their flags passed to the newly independent battalions. Beginning in the early 1990s the regiments were reactivated and the battalions, upon entering a regiment, returned the flags to the regiments and lost their independence.

  Division "Tridentina", *2002- (Bolzano)
  Alpine Brigade "Tridentina", *1951-2002
  2nd Alpine Division "Tridentina", *1934-1943
 2nd Alpine Brigade, *1923-1934
  Alpine Brigade "Taurinense", *1952- (Turin)
  1st Alpine Division "Taurinense", *1934-1943
 1st Alpine Brigade, *1923-1934
  Alpine Brigade "Julia", *1949- (Udine)
  3rd Alpine Division "Julia", *1934-1943
 3rd Alpine Brigade, *1923-1934
  Alpine Training Center, *1934-1943, 1948- (Aosta)
  Alpini Battalion "Aosta", *1886-1943, 1946-1989, received the flag of the 4th Alpini Regiment in 1975. Became a support unit of the Alpine Training Center in 1989.
  1st Alpini Command and Tactical Supports Unit, *2022 (Turin)
  1st Alpini Regiment, *1882-1943
  Alpini Battalion "Mondovì", *1886-1943, 1950-1997
  2nd Alpini Regiment, *1882-1943, 1963-74, 1992- (Cuneo)
  Alpini Battalion "Saluzzo", *1904-1943, 1945-1964, 1968-1992
  3rd Alpini Regiment, *1882-1917, 1920-1944, 1993-  (Pinerolo)
  Alpini Battalion "Susa", *1886-1943, 1945-1993
  4th Alpini Paratroopers Regiment, *1882-1943, 1946-1975, 2004- (Verona)
   Alpini Battalion "Monte Cervino", *1915-1919, 1940-1941, 1942-1943, 1996-2004, received the flag of the 4th Alpini Regiment in 1996.
  5th Alpini Regiment, *1882-1943, 1953-1975, 1992- (Sterzing)
  Alpini Battalion "Morbegno", *1886-1943, 1956-1992
  6th Alpini Regiment, *1882-1943, 1946-1975, 1993- (Innichen)
  Alpini Battalion "Bassano", *1886-1943, 1951-1993
  7th Alpini Regiment, *1887-1943, 1953-1975, 1992- (Belluno)
  Alpini Battalion "Feltre", *1886-1943, 1956-1992
  8th Alpini Regiment, *1909-1943, 1946-1975, 1992- (Cividale)
  Alpini Battalion "Tolmezzo", *1908-1943, 1946- (joined the regiment in 2005)
  9th Alpini Regiment, *1921-1943, 1991-(L'Aquila)
  Alpini Battalion "L'Aquila", *1935-1943, 1944-1991
 Alpini Battalion "Monte Berico", *1915-1919
  Alpini Battalion "Vicenza", *1886-1943, 1975-1996, 2017-
  14th Alpini Command and Tactical Supports Unit, *2022 (Udine)
  14th Alpini Regiment, *1993-2005 raised from the  "Tolmezzo" battalion in 1993. The battalion was transferred to the 8th Alpini Regiment in 2005 and the 14th was inactivated.

 Inactive units 
Inactivated units of the Alpini specialty:

  Alpine Brigade "Cadore", *1953-1997
  Alpine Brigade "Orobica", *1953-1991
  11th Alpini Regiment, *1935-1943, 1992-2002
  Alpini Battalion "Trento", *1918-1943, 1946-2002
  12th Alpini Regiment, *1936-1937, 1992-1997
  Alpini Battalion "Pieve di Cadore", *1886-1943, 1953-1997
  15th Alpini Regiment, *1992-1995
  Alpini Battalion "Cividale", *1909-1943, 1948-1995
  16th Alpini Regiment, *1991-2004
  Alpini Battalion "Belluno", *1910-1917, 1919-1943, 1953-2004
  18th Alpini Regiment, *1997-2004
  Alpini Battalion "Edolo", *1886-1943, 1945-2004
  Alpini Battalion "Gemona", *1886-1943, 1956-2005, received the flag of the 8th Alpini Regiment in 1975, re-entered the 8th Alpini Regiment in 1992, was replaced by the Alpini Battalion "Tolmezzo" in 2005
  Alpini Battalion "Tirano", *1886-1943, 1953-1991
 Alpini Battalion "Bolzano", *1937-1943, 1949-1975

Alpini Fortification (Alpini d'Arresto) battalions were tasked with manning the fortifications of the Vallo Alpino and received the names of 1st line reserve battalions of World War I. The three Alpini fortification groupings were regimental-level, administrative formation.

  11th Alpini Fortification Grouping, *1952-1975
  Alpini Battalion "Val Tagliamento", *1915-1918, 1939-1943, 1963-1992
 Alpini Battalion "Val Fella", *1915-1917, 1939-1943, 1963-1975
 Alpini Battalion "Val Natisone", *1915-1918, 1939-1943, 1963-1964
  21st Alpini Fortification Grouping, *1952-1964
  Alpini Battalion "Val Brenta", *1915-1919, 1939-1940, 1964-1986
 Alpini Battalion "Val Leogra", *1915-1917, 1939-1943, 1963-1964
  22nd Alpini Fortification Grouping, *1952-1962
  Alpini Battalion "Val Chiese", *1915-1919, 1939-1943, 1963-1979
 Alpini Battalion "Val Cismon", *1915-1919, 1939-1943, 1963-1975

 Paracadutisti 
 History 

Paracadutisti (Paratroopers) are the Italian Army's airborne forces. In 1975 Paracadutisti battalions, with the exception of the 2nd Battalion, were named for battles in which the Paracadutisti had distinguished themselves. The 2nd Battalion was named after the location of the first Italian Paratroopers school. Paratroopers regiments carry the name of World War II airborne divisions.

 Active units 
  Paratroopers Brigade "Folgore", *1963- (Livorno)
 185th Infantry Division "Folgore", *1941-1942
  Paratroopers Training Center, *1939-43, 1947- (Pisa)
  9th Paratroopers Assault Regiment "Col Moschin", *1918-1919, 1944-1945, 1995- (Livorno)
  9th Paratroopers Assault Battalion "Col Moschin", *1961-1995
  183rd Paratroopers Regiment "Nembo", *1993- (Pistoia)
  183rd Paratroopers Battalion "Nembo", *1991-1993, entered the 183rd Paratroopers Regiment "Nembo" in 1993 as 1st Paratroopers Battalion "Grizzano"
  183rd Mechanized Infantry Battalion "Nembo", *1975-1991
 183rd Infantry Regiment "Nembo", *1948-1975
 Paratroopers Infantry Regiment "Nembo", *1944-1948
 183rd Paratroopers Infantry Regiment "Nembo", *1943-1944
 184th Paratroopers Command and Tactical Supports Unit "Nembo", *2022 (Livorno)
 184th Paratroopers Infantry Regiment "Nembo", *1942-1944, merged into the Paratroopers Infantry Regiment "Nembo"
  185th Paratroopers Reconnaissance Target Acquisition Regiment "Folgore", *1942-1945, 2013- (Livorno)
  3rd Paratroopers Battalion "Poggio Rusco", *1975-1998, the flag of the battalion was given to the 185th Paratroopers Reconnaissance Target Acquisition Regiment in 2013, when the regiment had to transfers its flag to the reactivated 185th Paratroopers Artillery Regiment "Folgore"
 1st Paratroopers Regiment, *1963-1975
 1st Paratroopers Infantry Regiment, *1941-1942
  186th Paratroopers Regiment "Folgore", *1942, 1992- (Siena)
  5th Paratroopers Battalion "El Alamein", *1975-1992
 V Paratroopers Battalion, *1963-1975
 2nd Paratroopers Infantry Regiment, *1941-1942
  187th Paratroopers Regiment "Folgore", *1942, 1992- (Livorno)
  2nd Paratroopers Battalion "Tarquinia", *1975-1992
 II Paratroopers Battalion, *1963-1975
 3rd Paratroopers Infantry Regiment, *1941-1942

 Lagunari 

Lagunari are the Italian Army's amphibious forces. In 1975 the two Lagunari battalions were named for the honorary name of Republic of Venice and for the Sile river, which flows into the Venetian lagoon and was the location of heavy combat between Austro-Hungarian and Italian forces in 1918.

 Active units 
  Lagunari Regiment "Serenissima", *1951-1975, 1992- (Venice-Lido)
  1st Lagunari Battalion "Serenissima", *1975-1992

 Inactive units 
  Amphibious Battalion "Sile", *1975-1992 (Venice-Sant'Andrea)

 Cavalry Corps 

 Cavalleria di Linea (Cavalry of the Line) 
 History 
The ten oldest cavalry regiments were named for territories of the Savoyard state, while later units were named for Italian cities. The two exceptions to this rule are the 8th Regiment named for the Battle of Montebello and the 19th Regiment, which retained its title as Guides. The following lists includes the origin of the name for the oldest regiments in brackets before the date of founding. The first four regiments are Dragoons, with the rest of the regiments either being Lancers (Lancieri) or Chevau-légers (Cavalleggeri'').

Italian Army cavalry regiments are the army's only units, which have the name before their number, and who do not include a description of the type of unit in their name (unlike other regiments like i.e. 5th Alpini Regiment, 2nd Engineer Regiment, 32nd Tank Regiment, etc.)

 Dragoons:
 Regiment "Nizza Cavalleria" (1st)
 Regiment "Piemonte Cavalleria" (2nd)
 Regiment "Savoia Cavalleria" (3rd)
 Regiment "Genova Cavalleria" (4th)
 Lancers:
 Regiment "Lancieri di Novara" (5th)
 Regiment "Lancieri di Aosta" (6th)
 Regiment "Lancieri di Montebello" (8th)
 Chevau-légers:
 Regiment "Cavalleggeri di Lodi" (15th)
 Regiment "Cavalleggeri Guide" (19th)

Active units 
  Division "Vittorio Veneto", *2019 (Florence)
  Armored Brigade "Vittorio Veneto", *1975-1991
  Cavalry Brigade "Pozzuolo del Friuli", 1957- (Gorizia)
 Fast Brigade "Emanuele Filiberto Testa di Ferro" (II), *1935-1938
 II Cavalry Brigade, *1835-1849, 1859-1863, 1866, 1870-1935
  Cavalry School, *1823-1943, 1946- (Lecce)
  Regiment "Nizza Cavalleria" (1st) (County of Nice), *1690-1799, 1815-1943, 1946- (Bellinzago Novarese)
  Regiment "Piemonte Cavalleria" (2nd) (Principality of Piedmont), *1692-1799, 1815-1943, 1946- (Trieste)
  Regiment "Savoia Cavalleria" (3rd) (Duchy of Savoy), *1692-1798, 1815-1943, 1946- (Grosseto)
  Regiment "Genova Cavalleria" (4th) (Genevois province, later Duchy of Genoa), *1683-1799, 1815-1943, 1946- (Palmanova)
  Regiment "Lancieri di Novara" (5th), *1828-1943, 1946- (Codroipo)
  Regiment "Lancieri di Aosta" (6th) (Duchy of Aosta), *1774-1796, 1831-1943, 19451- (Palermo)
  Regiment "Lancieri di Montebello" (8th), *1859-1943, 1950- (Rome)
  Regiment "Cavalleggeri di Lodi" (15th), *1859-1920, 1942-1943, 1952-1995, 2020- (Lecce)
  Regiment "Cavalleggeri Guide" (19th), *1859-1945, 1949- (Salerno)
  Command and Tactical Supports Unit "Cavalleggeri di Treviso" (28th), *2022 (Gorizia)
  Regiment "Cavalleggeri di Treviso" (28th), *1909-1919, 1975-1991

Inactive units 
The Regiment "Lancieri di Firenze" (9th) was originally a unit of the Grand Duchy of Tuscany and became the only cavalry regiment of the conquered Italian states, which was allowed to join the Royal Sardinian Army. The inactivated units of the cavalry are:

  Regiment "Lancieri di Milano" (7th), *1859-1920, 1938-1943, 1964-1989
  Regiment "Lancieri di Firenze" (9th), *1859-1943, 1951-1957, 1975-1995
 Corpo Dragoni Toscani, *1753-1808, 1814-1859
  Regiment "Lancieri Vittorio Emanuele II" (10th), *1859-1943
  Regiment "Cavalleggeri di Saluzzo" (12th), (Marquisate of Saluzzo) *1848-1943, 1964-1991
  Regiment "Cavalleggeri di Monferrato" (13th), *1850-1943
  Regiment "Cavalleggeri di Alessandria" (14th), *1850-1943
 1964-1979: "Cavalleggeri di Alessandria" Reconnaissance Squadron
  Regiment "Cavalleggeri di Lucca" (16th), * 1859-1920, 1943

Carristi (Tankers)

History 
Originally the tank corps was a speciality of the infantry and named "Fanteria carrista" (Tank infantry). On 1 June 1999 the tank corps left the infantry and became part of the cavalry. In 1975 tank battalions were named for officers, soldiers and partisans, who were posthumously awarded Italy's highest military honor the Gold Medal of Military Valour for heroism during World War II.

Active units 
  132nd Armored Brigade "Ariete", *1986- (Pordenone)
  Armored Division "Ariete", *1948-1986
  132nd Armored Division "Ariete", *1937-1943
  1st Armored Regiment, *1936-1943, 1948-1949, 1959- (Teulada)
  4th Tank Regiment, *1936-1943, 1953-1975, 1992- (Persano)
  20th Tank Battalion "M.O. Pentimalli", *1975-1991
  7th Tank Command and Tactical Supports Unit "M.O. Di Dio", *2022 (Pordenone)
  7th Tank Battalion "M.O. Di Dio", *1975-1991
 VII Tank Battalion, *1941-1942, 1949-1975
  32nd Tank Regiment, *1936-1944, 1964-1975, 1992- (Tauriano)
  3rd Tank Battalion "M.O. Galas", *1975-1992
  132nd Tank Regiment, *1941-1942, 1944, 1948-1975, 1992- (Cordenons)
  8th Tank Battalion "M.O. Secchiaroli", *1975-1992

Inactive units 
  Armored Brigade "Centauro", *1986-2002
  Armored Division "Centauro", *1951-1986
  131st Armored Division "Centauro", *1936-1943
  31st Armored Brigade "Curtatone", *1975-1986 renamed Armored Brigade "Centauro" in 1986
  32nd Armored Brigade "Mameli", *1975-1991
  132nd Armored Brigade "Manin", *1975-1986 renamed Armored Brigade "Ariete" in 1986
  2nd Tank Regiment, *1991-1995
  22nd Tank Battalion "M.O. Piccinini", *1975-1991
  3rd Armored Infantry Regiment, *1927-1943, 1964-1975
  9th Armored Battalion "M.O. Butera", *1975-1995
  31st Tank Regiment, *1937-1943, 1951-1975, 1993-2020
  1st Tank Battalion "M.O. Cracco", *1975-1993
  33rd Tank Regiment, *1939-1943, 1993-2001
  6th Tank Battalion "M.O. Scapuzzi", *1976-1993
  11th Tank Battalion "M.O. Calzecchi", *1976-2001
 XI Tank Battalion, *1941-1942, 1960-1975
  60th Tank Regiment "M.O. Locatelli", *1991-1992
  60th Tank Battalion "M.O. Locatelli", *1975-1991
 LX Tank Battalion, *1940-1941, 1960-1975
  63rd Tank Regiment, *1991-1995
  63rd Tank Battalion "M.O. Fioritto", *1975-1991
 LXIII Tank Battalion, *1939-1941, 1958-1975
  131st Tank Regiment, *1941-1942, 1993-2013
  101st Tank Battalion "M.O. Zappalà", *1975-1993
  133rd Tank Regiment, *1941-1942, 1992-1995
  10th Tank Battalion "M.O. Bruno", *1975-1991
  4th Tank Battalion "M.O. Passalacqua", *1975-1992
 IV Tank Battalion, *1940-1942, 1959-1975
  5th Tank Battalion "M.O. Chiamenti", *1975-1992
 V Tank Battalion, *1940-1941, 1964-1975
  13th Tank Battalion "M.O. Pascucci", *1975-1989
 XIII Tank Battalion, *1941-1942, 1961-1975
  19th Armored Battalion "M.O. Tumiati", *1975-1991
 XIX Armored Battalion, *1941-1943, 1960-1975
 31st Tank Battalion "M.O. Andreani", *1982-1993
 Armored Battalion (of the Armored Troops School), *1975-1982
  62nd Armored Battalion "M.O. Jero", *1975-1992
 LXII Armored Battalion, *1940-1941, 1960-1975

Artillery Corps

Artiglieria Terrestre (Field Artillery)

History

Active units 
Each Field Artillery regiment consists of a HQ platoon, a target acquisition battery, a logistic support battery and an artillery group with a command platoon and three firing batteries 6x artillery systems each.

  Artillery Command, *??? (Bracciano)
  Field Artillery Regiment "a Cavallo" (Horse Artillery), *1831 (Milano)
  1st Field Artillery Regiment (Mountain), *1887 (Fossano)
  Mountain Artillery Group "Aosta", *1910-1992
  3rd Field Artillery Regiment (Mountain), *1902 (Tolmezzo)
  Mountain Artillery Group "Conegliano", *1909-1992
  5th Field Artillery Regiment "Superga", *1850 (Portogruaro)
  5th Heavy Field Artillery Group "Superga", *1976-1991
  8th Field Artillery Regiment "Pasubio", *1696 (Persano)
  8th Self-propelled Artillery Group "Pasubio", *1975-1992
  21st Field Artillery Regiment "Trieste", *1888 (Foggia)
  21st Artillery Group "Romagna", *1975-1993
  24th Field Artillery Regiment "Peloritani", *1888 (Messina)
  24th Field Artillery Group "Peloritani", *1975-1992
  52nd Artillery Regiment "Torino", *1916 (Vercelli)
  52nd Field Artillery Group "Venaria", *1975-1992
  132nd Field Artillery Regiment "Ariete", *1939 (Maniago)
  132nd Heavy Field Artillery Group "Rovereto", in Casarsa della Delizia, *1975-1993
  185th Paratroopers Artillery Regiment "Folgore", *1941 (Bracciano)
  185th Paratroopers Field Artillery Group "Viterbo", *1975-1992

Inactive units 
  3rd Missile Brigade "Aquileia", *1959-1991
  1st Field Artillery (Training) Group "Cacciatore delle Alpi", *1976-1999
  3rd Self-propelled Field Artillery Group "Pastrengo", *1975-1991
  11th Field Artillery Regiment "Legnano", *1884-1991
  11th Field Artillery Group "Monferrato", *1975-1991 
  12th Self-propelled Field Artillery Group "Capua", *1884-1991
  13th Artillery Regiment "Granatieri di Sardegna", *1888-1995
  13th Field Artillery Group "Magliana", *1975-1992
  14th Field Artillery Group "Murge", *1888-30 June 1991
  19th Self-propelled Field Artillery Group "Rialto", *1975-1993 
  20th Self-propelled Field Artillery Group "Piave", *???-March 1991
  27th Heavy Self-propelled Artillery Regiment "Marche", *1912-1995
  27th Heavy Self-propelled Artillery Group "Marche", *1985-1992
  28th Self-propelled Field Artillery Group "Livorno", *1912-1995
  33rd Field Artillery Regiment "Acqui", *1915-2013
  33rd Heavy Field Artillery Group "Terni", *1975-1993
  35th Field Artillery Group "Riolo", 1915-1991
  46th Self-propelled Field Artillery Group "Trento", *1975-1993
  47th Field Artillery Group "Gargano", *1915-1981
  48th Field Artillery Regiment "Taro", *1915-1995
  108th Heavy Field Artillery Group "Cosseria", *1941-31 October 1986
  120th Self-propelled Field Artillery Group "Po", *1942-1991
  131st Field Artillery Regiment "Centauro", *1939-2001
  131st Heavy Field Artillery Group "Vercelli", *1975-1992
  9th Self-propelled Field Artillery Group "Brennero", *1863-1992, merged with 131st Heavy Field Artillery Group to form the 131st Field Artillery Regiment
  155th Heavy Field Artillery Group "Emilia", *1941-1992
  184th Field Artillery Regiment "Nembo", *1942-1996
  184th Heavy Field Artillery Group "Filottrano", *1976-1993
  205th Heavy Field Artillery Group "Lomellina", *1940-1991

Heavy Field Artillery 
Corps level support units were designated as "Heavy Field Artillery" (previously: "Army Corps Artillery Regiment"):

  2nd HeavyField Artillery Group "Potenza", *1920-1995
  4th Heavy Field Artillery Group "Pusteria", *1975-1992
  4th Heavy Field Artillery Regiment, *1920-1975
  6th Heavy Field Artillery Regiment, 1951-1974
  9th HeavyField Artillery Group "Foggia", *1975-1996
  9th Heavy Field Artillery Regiment, *1920-1975
  10th Self-propelled Field Artillery Group "Avisio", *1939-1986
  11th Heavy Field Artillery Regiment "Teramo", *1920-2001

Heavy Artillery 
Army level support units were designated as "Heavy Artillery" (previously: "Army Artillery Regiment"):

  1st Heavy Artillery Group "Adige", *1975-31 July 1983
  3rd Heavy Artillery Regiment "Volturno" *1992-2001
  3rd Missile Group "Volturno" *1975-1992
  3rd Missile Artillery Regiment, *1961-1975
  3rd Heavy Artillery Regiment, *1926-1961
  9th Heavy Field Artillery Regiment "Rovigo", *1992-1995
  9th Heavy Artillery Group "Rovigo", *1975-1992
  9th Heavy Artillery Regiment, *1926-1973

Mountain Artillery 
  1st Mountain Artillery Regiment groups until 1975:
  Mountain Artillery Group "Aosta", *1910-
 Mountain Artillery Group "Susa", *???-1975
 Mountain Artillery Group "Mondovì", *???-1975
  2nd Mountain Artillery Regiment, *1909-2015
  Mountain Artillery Group "Vicenza", *1909-1992
  Mountain Artillery Group "Asiago", *1952-1991
 Mountain Artillery Group "Verona", *1952-1975
  3rd Mountain Artillery Regiment groups until 1975:
  Mountain Artillery Group "Belluno", *1909-1989
  Mountain Artillery Group "Conegliano", *1909-
  Mountain Artillery Group "Udine", *1915-1995
  Mountain Artillery Group "Pinerolo", *1926-1991
 Mountain Artillery Group "Osoppo", *1961-1975
  5th Mountain Artillery Regiment, *1935-2001
  Mountain Artillery Group "Bergamo", *1910-1992
  Mountain Artillery Group "Sondrio", *1953-1989
 Mountain Artillery Group "Vestone", *1953-1975
  6th Mountain Artillery Regiment, *1941-1995
  Mountain Artillery Group "Lanzo", *1935-1992
  Mountain Artillery Group "Agordo", *1953-1991
 Mountain Artillery Group "Pieve di Cadore", *1953-1975

Target Acquisition 
  3rd Artillery Specialists Group "Bondone", *1986-1992,
  4th Artillery Specialists Group "Bondone", *1976-1986,
  3rd Heavy Field Artillery Regiment, *1956-1976,
  5th Artillery Specialists Group "Medea", *1956-21 March 1991, named Artillery Specialist Group "Mantova" 1976-1986
  6th Artillery Specialists Group "Montello", *1976-30 June 1991, named Artillery Specialist Group "Folgore" 1976-1986
 7th Artillery Specialists Group "Casarsa", *1976-31 January 1991, named Artillery Specialist Group "Ariete" 1976-1986
  12th Artillery Specialists Group "Biella", *1975-29 September 1992, named Artillery Specialist Group "Centauro" 1975-1986
 30th Artillery Specialists Group "Brianza", *1975-28 February 1991, for III Army Corps, but only the 3rd battery was active as part of the Horse Artillery Regiment in Milan

Artiglieria Controaerei (Anti-aircraft Artillery)

History

Active units 
Each Air-defense Artillery regiment consists of a HQ battery, a logistic support battery and an air-defense group.

  Anti-aircraft Artillery Command, *1941 (Sabaudia)
  Anti-aircraft Artillery Training Regiment (Sabaudia)
  4th Anti-aircraft Artillery Regiment "Peschiera", *1930 (Mantova)
  17th Anti-aircraft Artillery Regiment "Sforzesca", *1888 (Sabaudia)
  121st Anti-aircraft Artillery Regiment "Ravenna", *1941 (Bologna)

Inactive units 
  Anti-Aircraft Artillery Command, *???
 1st Heavy Anti-aircraft Artillery Regiment, *1992-1996
  2nd Anti-aircraft Artillery Regiment, *1992-1996
  3rd Anti-aircraft Artillery Regiment "Firenze", *1992-2001
  5th Anti-aircraft Artillery Regiment "Pescara", *1964-2014
  8th Anti-aircraft Artillery Regiment, *1992-1995
  8th Field Artillery Group "Marmore", *1986-1992
  8th Heavy Field Artillery Regiment, *1951-1986
  18th Anti-aircraft Artillery Regiment, *1992-1997
  18th Self-propelled Field Artillery Group "Gran Sasso", *1976-1981

Light anti-aircraft artillery groups were activated in 1975 as reserve units with older equipment, but never filled with troops. They were named for birds of prey and disbanded in the early 1990s:

 11th Light Anti-aircraft Artillery Group "Falco", *1975-??
 12th Light Anti-aircraft Artillery Group "Nibbio", *1975-??
 13th Light Anti-aircraft Artillery Group "Condor", *1975-??
 14th Light Anti-aircraft Artillery Group "Astore", *1975-??
 21st Light Anti-aircraft Artillery Group "Sparviero", *1975-??
 22nd Light Anti-aircraft Artillery Group "Alcione", *1975-??

Special Artillery Units 
  7th CBRN Defense Regiment "Cremona", *1860 (Civitavecchia)
  7th Field Artillery Regiment "Cremona", *1992-1998
  7th Field Artillery Group "Adria", *1975-1992
  7th Field Artillery Regiment, *1946-1975
  41st Regiment "Cordenons" (ISTAR), *1975 (Casarsa della Delizia)
  41st Heavy Field Artillery Regiment, *1915-1975 (Sora)
  13th HUMINT Regiment, *2016 (Anzio)
  13th HUMINT Battalion "Aquileia", *2005 (Anzio)
  13th Target Acquisition Group "Aquileia", *1960-1993, re-raised in 2005 (Verona)
  1st NBC Battalion "Etruria", *1967-1994 (Rieti)

Engineer Corps

History 
The Engineer Corps was founded on 11 June 1775 as the "Royal Corps of Engineers" ("Corpo Reale degli Ingegneri") of the army of the Kingdom of Piedmont-Sardinia. With the integration of the engineer units of the Italian states conquered during the Second Italian War of Independence the Corps was elevated on 11 January 1861 to a service branch of the Army and became the "Arma del Genio". In 1915 when Italy entered  World War I the Royal Italian Army fielded six regiments and two battalions:

 1st Engineer Regiment (Sappers), in Pavia 
 2nd Engineer Regiment (Sappers), in Casale Monferrato 
 3rd Engineer Regiment (Telegraphers), in Florence
 4th Engineer Regiment (Pontieri), in Piacenza
 5th Engineer Regiment (Miners), in Turin 
 6th Engineer Regiment (Ferrovieri), in Turin 
 Specialist Engineer Battalion
 Aviation Engineer Battalion (transferred to the Corpo Aeronautico Militare at the outbreak of hostilities)

During the war the Engineer Branch expanded and created new types of units:
 Sappers companies were mostly employed to build the trenches along the Isonzo front - expanded from 43x to 236x companies
 Flamethrower companies - 9x were raised
 Telegraphers companies tasked with managing the military's communications - expanded from 24x to 139x companies
 Telephone companies tasked with laying and maintaining phone cables along the front - 57x companies were raised
 Pontieri companies - expanded from 12x to 26x companies
 Ferrovieri companies - expanded from 6x to 22x companies
 Miners companies tasked with building defensive positions in the Alps - expanded from 20x to 53x companies
 Lagunari companies tasked with providing transportation in the Marano lagoon and on Lake Garda and Lake Idro

Besides these also transport, ropeway, photography and poison gas companies were raised during the war.

In May 1940 when Italy entered World War II the branch fielded 18x engineer regiments, which contained a mix of sappers and signalers. The branch also fielded two mining, two Pontieri, and one Ferrovieri regiment. During the war each division received a mixed engineer battalion providing sappers and signalers. After the war the branch was rebuilt as part of the Italian Army, fielding three pioneer, one Pontieri, one Ferrovieri and one fortification engineer battalion, along with mixed engineer battalions for the army's divisions. In 1953 the signal units were split from the engineer branch to form their own service branch.

In 1975 all independent battalions of the engineer branch were named for a lake if they supported a corps or named for a river if they supported a division or brigade. In the same year every brigade of the army received a pioneer company, which carried the name of the brigade they it was subordinated to. The battalions of the 2nd Pontieri Engineer Regiment and the Ferrovieri Engineer Regiment received no names. In 1975 the army fielded two miners, one sapper and nine pioneer battalions, and 24x brigade engineer companies.

After the end of the Cold War the army renamed all battalions as regiments, although the composition of the units didn't change. In 1993 the brigade's engineer companies were merged with the brigade's signal companies to create Command and Tactical Support Units. After 2001 the engineer companies of the Command and Tactical Support Units were merged with the existing engineer battalions and each brigade received an engineer regiment.

Active units 
Today the service branch is divided into four specialties: Sappers ("Guastatori"), Pioneers ("Pionieri"), Bridge Engineers ("Pontieri") and Railroad Engineers ("Ferrovieri"). Units marked with a * are named after rivers.

  Engineer Command, *???- (Cecchignola)
  2nd Engineer Regiment, *1860-1919, 1922-1943, 1954-1975, 1995- (Trento)
  2nd Mining Engineer Battalion "Iseo", *1975-1995
 XXXI Sapper Battalion
  3rd Engineer Regiment, *1922-1943, 1954-1975, 1992- (Udine)
  3rd Sapper Battalion "Verbano", *1976-1992
  4th Engineer Regiment, *1922-1943, 1992-  (Palermo)
  51st Engineer Battalion "Simeto"*, *1983-1992, entered the reactivated 4th Engineer Regiment in 1992, which held the 51st's flag (which included the traditions of the 12th Engineer Regiment) until its own flag was returned in 1995
  5th Engineer Regiment, *1895-1943, 1951–75, 2003- (Macomer)
  5th Engineer Battalion "Bolsena", *1976-2001
  6th Pioneer Regiment, *1922-1943, 1993- (Rome)
  6th Engineer Battalion "Trasimeno", *1976-1993
 Pioneer Battalion "Granatieri di Sardegna", *1952-1975
 Pioneer Battalion "Nemi", *2005-
  8th Paratroopers Engineer Regiment "Folgore", *1922-1943, 1992-1995, 2004- (Legnago)
  8th Paratroopers Engineer Battalion "Folgore", *2001-2004
 VIII Paratroopers Engineer Battalion, *1941-1942
  10th Engineer Regiment, *1922-1943, 1993- (Cremona)
  3rd Engineer Battalion "Lario", *1975-1993
 III Army Corps Engineer Battalion, *1953-1975
  11th Engineer Regiment, *1928-1943, 1993- (Foggia)
  132nd Engineer Battalion "Livenza"*, *1975-1993
 Pioneer Battalion "Ariete", *1958-1975
  21st Engineer Regiment, *1937-1942, 1993- (Caserta)
  21st Engineer Battalion "Timavo"*, *1975-1993
 XXI Pioneer Battalion, *1953-1975
  32nd Engineer Regiment, *2004- (Turin)
  32nd Engineer Battalion, *1941-1942, 2002-2004
 XXX Sapper Battalion
 XXXII Sapper Battalion
  Ferrovieri Engineer Regiment, *1910-1943, 1957- (Castel Maggiore)
  2nd Pontieri Engineer Regiment, *1883-1943, 1949- (Piacenza)

Inactive units 
Inactivated units of the Engineer branch follow below. Units marked with a * are named after rivers.

  1st Engineer Regiment, *1848-1943, 1950-1964, 1993-1995
  1st Mining Engineer Battalion "Garda", *1975-1991
  4th Engineer Battalion "Orta", *1975-1993, entered the 1st Engineer Regiment in 1993 with the flag of the 4th Engineer Regiment, the flag was returned to the 4th in 1995
  104th Engineer Battalion "Torre"*, *1976-1986, flag of the 7th Engineer Regiment
 Pioneer Battalion "Mantova", *1949-1975
  131st Engineer Battalion "Ticino"*, *1975-1993, flag of the 9th Engineer Regiment (*1922-1953)
 Pioneer Battalion "Centauro", *1958-1975
 CXXXI Mixed Engineer Battalion, *1939-1943
  184th Engineer Battalion "Santerno"*, *1975-1992, flag of the 8th Engineer Regiment
 Pioneer Battalion "Folgore", *1944-1975

Signal Corps

History 

The Signal branch of the army began as a speciality of the army's engineer branch, when in 1883 two telegraph battalions were raised and joined the 3rd Engineer Regiment. During World War I the speciality expanded rapidly and the war's end fielded 139x Telegraph Companies and 57x Telephone Companies. After the war a second Telegraph Regiment was raised and 26 Telegraph battalions were assigned to various commands of the army. During World War II the Signal Speciality raised a hundreds of units to join the various divisions of the Regio Esercito.

After the war the specialty was finally split from the Engineer Branch and on 16 May 1953 became an autonomous specialty of the army. Over the years the specialty grew and on 30 December 1997 it was finally elevated to a service branch of the army, with two specialities: Signal specialists and Electronic Warfare Specialists.

Active units 
If not specified otherwise all Signal battalions below were activated in 1975. All signal battalions, with the exception of the 45th, 46th, 47th, 51st and 184th, were named after Italian mountain passes. The 45th and 46th were named after volcanoes, while the 47th and 184th were named after mountain massifs and the 51st kept the name of the Cold War "Legnano" division it once belonged to.

  Signal Command, *2007 (Anzio)
  Tactical Intelligence Brigade, *2001 (Anzio)
  NRDC-ITA Support Brigade, *2001 (Milan)
  Signal and IT School, (Rome)
  1st Signal Regiment, *1919 (Milan)
  3rd Signal Battalion "Spluga", formed in 1975, elevated to 1st Signal Regiment in 1995
  231st Signal Battalion "Sempione", formed in 1975, disbanded 1991, reformed and entered the 1st Signal Regiment in 2001
  2nd Alpine Signal Regiment (Alpini), *1926 (Bolzano)
  4th Signal Battalion "Gardena", formed in 1975, elevated to 2nd (Alpine) Signal Regiment in 1992
  42nd Signal Battalion "Pordoi", formed in 1975, disbanded 1992, reformed and entered the 2nd (Alpine) Signal Regiment in 2005
  3rd Signal Regiment, *1883 (Rome)
  10th Signal Battalion "Lanciano", formed in 1975, elevated to 3rd Signal Regiment in 1993
  43rd Signal Battalion "Abetone", formed in 1975, elevated to 43rd Signal Regiment in 1993, regiment disbanded in 1998 and the battalion entered the 3rd Signal Regiment the next day
  47th Signal Battalion "Gennargentu", formed in 1996, entered 3rd Signal Regiment in 2000
  7th Signal Regiment, *1918 (Sacile)
  5th Signal Battalion "Rolle", formed in 1975, elevated to 7th Signal Regiment in 1992
  107th Signal Battalion "Predil", formed in 1975, disbanded 1991, reformed and entered the 7th Signal Regiment in 2002
  11th Signal Regiment, *1940 (Civitavecchia)
  8th ELINT Battalion "Tonale", formed in 1976, disbanded 1998, reformed as Signal Battalion "Tonale" and entered the 11th Signal Regiment in 2001
  11th Signal Battalion "Leonessa", formed in 1975, elevated to 11th Signal Regiment in 1992
  32nd Signal Regiment, *1953 (Padova)
  32nd Signal Battalion "Valles", formed in 1975, elevated to 32nd Signal Regiment in 1992
  41st Signal Battalion "Frejus", formed in 1975, elevated to 41st Signal Regiment in 1993, regiment disbanded in 1998 and the battalion entered the 32nd Signal Regiment the next day
  33rd EW Regiment, *2002 (Treviso)
  33rd Electronic Warfare Battalion "Falzarego", formed in 1975, elevated to 33rd Electronic Warfare Regiment in 2002
  44th TLC Support Battalion "Penne", reverted to battalion in 2016
  44th Signal Support Regiment, *1993-2016 (Rome)
  44th Signal Battalion "Penne", formed in 1957, named "Penne" in 1975, elevated to 44th Signal Regiment in 1993, became 44th Signal Support Regiment in 1997
  46th Signal Regiment, *1997 (Palermo)
  45th Signal Battalion "Vulture", formed in 1975, elevated to 45th Signal Regiment in 1993, regiment disbanded in 2000 and the battalion entered the 46th Signal Regiment the next day
  46th Signal Battalion "Mongibello", formed in 1976, elevated to 46th Signal Regiment in 1997
  184th TLC Support Battalion "Cansiglio", reverted to battalion in 2016
  184th Signal Support Regiment, *1998-2016 (Treviso)
  184th Signal Battalion "Cansiglio", formed in 1944, named "Cansiglio" in 1975, disbanded in 1993, reformed in 1998 as 184th Signal Support Regiment
  232nd Signal Regiment, *1939-1991, activated anew in 2004 (Avellino) 
 51st Signal Battalion "Legnano", formed in 2004
  232nd Signal Battalion "Fadalto", formed in 1975, disbanded 1991, reformed and entered the 232nd Signal Regiment in 2015

Inactive units 
Inactivated units of the Signal branch:
  Maneuver Support Signal Brigade, *1998-2007
  National Support Signal Brigade, *2000-2007
  9th Electronic Warfare Battalion "Rombo", *1976 - inactivated on 20 January 1998
  13th Signal Battalion "Mauria", *1975 - inactivated on 30 November 1991

Transport and Material Corps

History

Active units 
  Logistic Regiment "Aosta" (Messina)
  Logistic Regiment "Ariete", *2015 (Maniago)
  Logistic Battalion "Ariete", in Maniago, *1986-2015
  Logistic Battalion "Manin", in Maniago, *1975-1986
  Logistic Regiment "Folgore", *2013 (Pisa)
  6th Maneuver Logistic Regiment, *2001-2013
  Logistic Battalion "Folgore", *1975-2001
  6th General Logistic Support Regiment, *2015 (Budrio)
  6th Transport Regiment, *2001-2015
  Logistic Battalion "Friuli", *1975-2001
  Logistic Regiment "Garibaldi", *2013 (Persano)
  10th Maneuver Regiment, *2001-2013
  Logistic Battalion "Persano", *1991-2001
  Logistic Battalion "Garibaldi", *1976-1991
  Logistic Regiment "Julia", *2013 (Meran)
  24th Maneuver Regiment "Dolomiti", *1994-2013
  Logistic Battalion "Orobica", joined the battalion in 1991
  24th Maneuver Logistic Battalion "Dolomiti", *1986-1994
  4th Army Corps Autogroup "Claudia", *1975-1986
  Logistic Regiment "Pinerolo", *2013 (Bari)
  10th Transport Regiment, *2001-2013
  Logistic Battalion "Pinerolo", joined the regiment in 2001
  10th Logistic Support Regiment, *1998-2001
  10th Transport Battalion "Appia", *1987-1998
  Logistic Regiment "Pozzuolo del Friuli", *2015 (Remanzacco)
  8th Transport Regiment, *2002-2015
  8th Maneuver Regiment "Carso", *1994-2002
  8th Maneuver Logistic Battalion "Carso", *1986-1994
  Maneuver Logistic Battalion "Mantova", *1975-1986
  Logistic Regiment "Sassari", *2019 (Teulada)
  Logistic Battalion "Cremona", *1975-1996
  Logistic Regiment "Taurinense", *2013 (Rivoli)
  1st Maneuver Regiment, *2001-2013
  Logistic Battalion "Taurinense", joined the regiment in 2001
  1st Logistic Support Regiment "Monviso", *1998-2001
  1st Transport Battalion "Monviso", *1990-1998
  Joint Forces Maneuver Regiment (Rome)
  10th Joint Transport Battalion "Salaria", *???-???
  Transit Areas Management Regiment, (Bellinzago Novarese)
  Logistic Battalion "Centauro", *1986-???
  Logistic Battalion "Curtatone", *1975-1986
  8th Transport Regiment "Casilina", (Rome)
  11th Transport Regiment "Flaminia", (Rome)
  33rd Logistic and Tactical Support Regiment "Ambrosiano", *2022 (Solbiate Olona)
  NRDC-ITA Tactical and Logistic Support Regiment, *2002-2022
  33rd Logistic Maneuver Regiment "Ambrosiano", *1993-2002
  33rd Logistic Maneuver Battalion "Ambrosiano", *1986-1993
  33rd Logistic Maneuver Battalion "Piemonte", *1982-1986
  Logistic Maneuver Battalion "Centauro", *1975-1986
  3rd Army Corps Autogroup "Fulvia", *1975-1986

Inactive units 
  5th Army Corps Autogroup "Postumia", in Treviso, *1975-???
  13th Logistic Battalion "Aquileia", in Portogruaro
  Logistic Battalion "Acqui", in L'Aquila
  Logistic Battalion "Brescia", in Montorio Veronese
  Logistic Battalion "Cadore", in Belluno
  Logistic Battalion "Goito", in Monza
  Logistic Battalion "Granatieri di Sardegna, in Civitavecchia
  Logistic Battalion "Gorizia", in Gradisca d'Isonzo
  Logistic Battalion "Julia", in Udine
  Logistic Battalion "Legnano", in Presezzo
  Logistic Battalion "Mameli", in Vacile
  Logistic Battalion "Mantova", in Tricesimo, * 1986-???
  Logistic Battalion "Isonzo", in Tricesimo, *1975-1986
  Logistic Battalion "Orobica", in Tricesimo, *1975-???
  Logistic Battalion "Pozzuolo del Friuli", in Visco
  Logistic Battalion "Trieste", in Budrio
  Logistic Battalion "Tridentina", in Vahrn
  Logistic Battalion "Vittorio Veneto", in Cervignano del Friuli
  5th Maneuver Logistic Battalion "Euganeo", in Treviso, *1986-???
  Maneuver Logistic Battalion "Folgore", in Treviso, *1975-1986
  50th Maneuver Logistic Battalion "Carnia", in Casarsa della Delizia, *1986-???
  Maneuver Logistic Battalion "Ariete", in Casarsa della Delizia, *1975-1986
  7th Mixed Transport Battalion, in Florence
  11th Mixed Transport Battalion "Etnea", in Palermo
 12th Mixed Transport Battalion, in Cagliari
  14th Transport Battalion "Flavia", in Montorio Veronese
 16th Mixed Transport Battalion, in Padua

Army Aviation Corps

History 
In May 1951 the first aviation unit was created at the army's Artillery School in Bracciano. The first aircraft in service were L-18C Super Cubs. In 1952 the army created four Light Plane Sections to support its four army corps. In 1956 the first AB 47G helicopters arrived. On 1 June 1957 the training unit was moved to Viterbo and became the Army Light Aviation Training Center. By 1964 four units of helicopters and 19 sections of light airplanes existed. By 1974 four helicopter units and 27 Light Aviation units fielded a mix of L-18C Super Cub, L-19E Bird Dog, and L-21B Super Cub planes and AB 47G planes, and AB 47G, AB 47J, AB 204B, AB 205, AB 206 helicopters.

With the army reform in 1975 the light planes and helicopter units were merged into squadron groups, equally in size to a battalion. Additionally three Army Light Aviation Groupings were created: one for the IV Alpine Army Corps, one for the V Army Corps, and one for the general staff. The new units were named for celestial objects: Groupings were named for stars, while squadron groups were named for constellations and planets of the Solar System.

After the Cold War the army reduced the number of squadrons groups, renamed the groupings to regiments and dropped the "Light" from the specialties name.

Active units 

  Army Aviation Command, *1997- (Viterbo)
  Army Aviation Brigade, *2001- (Viterbo)
   Army Aviation Training Center, *1952- (Viterbo)
 1st Training Squadrons Group "Auriga"
 1st Ground Support Squadrons Group "Sestante"
  1st Army Aviation Regiment "Antares", *1976- (Viterbo)
 11th Squadrons Group "Ercole"
 28th Squadrons Group "Tucano"
  2nd Army Aviation Regiment "Sirio", *1996- (Lamezia Terme)
 21st Squadrons Group "Orsa Maggiore"
 30th Squadrons Group "Pegaso"
  3rd Special Operations Helicopter Regiment "Aldebaran", *1993-1998, 2015- (Viterbo)
 26th Squadrons Group "Giove"
  4th Army Aviation Regiment "Altair", *1976- (Bolzano)
 34th Squadrons Group "Toro"
 54th Squadrons Group "Cefeo"
  5th Army Aviation Regiment "Rigel", *1976- (Casarsa della Delizia)
 27th Squadrons Group "Mercurio"
 49th Squadrons Group "Capricorno"
  7th Army Aviation Regiment "Vega", *1996- (Rimini)
 25th Squadrons Group "Cigno"
 48th Squadrons Group "Pavone"
  1st Army Aviation Support Regiment "Idra", *1953- (Bracciano)
  2nd Army Aviation Support Regiment "Orione", *1957- (Bologna)
  3rd Army Aviation Support Regiment "Aquila", *1965- (Orio al Serio)
  4th Army Aviation Support Squadrons Group "Scorpione", *1976- (Viterbo)

Inactive units 
Inactivated units of the Aviation speciality:
 12th Squadrons Group "Gru" - inactivated on 1 September 1981
 20th Squadrons Group "Andromeda" - inactivated during 2013-2014
 23rd Squadrons Group "Eridano" - inactivated in 1993
 24th Squadrons Group "Orione" - inactivated on 31 December 1993
 39th Squadrons Group "Drago" - inactivated on 4 November 2002
 44th Squadrons Group "Fenice" - inactivated on 4 July 1996
 46th Squadrons Group "Sagittario" - inactivated in 1993
 47th Squadrons Group "Levrieri"
 51st Squadrons Group "Leone" - inactivated on 4 November 2002
 53rd Squadrons Group "Cassiopea" - inactivated 31 December 2015
 55th Squadrons Group "Dragone" - inactivated 1 March 2006

See also

References 

Army units and formations of Italy
Italian Army (post-1946)

de:Liste italienischer Regimenter
it:Lista dei reggimenti dell'Esercito Italiano